The 1993 Davis Cup World Group Qualifying Round was held from 22 to 27 September. They were the main play-offs of the 1993 Davis Cup. The winners of the playoffs advanced to the 1994 Davis Cup World Group, and the losers were relegated to their respective Zonal Regions I.

Teams
Bold indicates team had qualified for the 1993 Davis Cup World Group.

From World Group

 
 
 
 
 
 
 
 

 From Americas Group I

 
 

 From Asia/Oceania Group I

 
 

 From Europe/Africa Group I

Results summary
Date: 22–27 September

The eight losing teams in the World Group first round ties and eight winners of the Zonal Group I final round ties competed in the World Group Qualifying Round for spots in the 1994 World Group.

Qualifying results

Israel vs. Switzerland

Hungary vs. Argentina

New Zealand vs. Austria

United States vs. Bahamas

Belgium vs. Brazil

Denmark vs. Croatia

Russia vs. Cuba

South Korea vs. Spain

See also

 Davis Cup

References

External links
Davis Cup Official Website

World Group Qualifying Round